Zirimzi (Yeremyä) is a rural locality (a village) in Aksaitovsky Selsoviet, Tatyshlinsky District, Bashkortostan, Russia. The population was 196 as of 2010. There are 2 streets.

Geography 
Zirimzi is located 24 km northwest of Verkhniye Tatyshly (the district's administrative centre) by road. Novochukurovo is the nearest rural locality.

References 

Rural localities in Tatyshlinsky District